The Flower in His Mouth is a 1975 Italian drama film directed by Luigi Zampa and starring Jennifer O'Neill.

Plot 
Teacher Elena Bardi transfers herself from Sondrio in a Sicilian town, where she is harassed by a man without anyone intervening. The next morning he is found executed. Elena finds lodging with a lawyer named Bellocampo, who is an enigmatic landowner who knows all the unmentionable secrets of the city. At school Elena clashes with the difficulties of school evasion, while her non-conformism prevents her from tying up with her colleagues, except with Professor Belcore, with whom she starts a relationship, which he does not dare to make public. One day Bellocampo leads her to the poor neighborhoods of the city where school evasion originates and informs her that the degradation could be eliminated with the approval of a law firm in Parliament.

When she is the victim of a second aggression whose executioners are also found dead, Elena realizes that everyone thinks she has a mysterious power. Although concerned by this notion, she decides to use it to ask the Mayor to bestow grants to the poorest families, which he immediately obtains. The consideration towards her increases so much that now everyone sends their children to school. She also meets the powerful Senator Cataudella and asks him to unblock the law for the rehabilitation of poor neighborhoods, which happens a short time later.

Nevertheless, a journalist tells her that in reality only a portion of the law was approved to intervene in areas that involve a speculation from Bellocampo. Faced with Elena's indignation, he tells her to hate the city because they killed his brother when he was a podestà. Elena realizes that she has been used, and even Belcore ends up being so cowardly. She then decides to leave, but the morning of departure does not go on the bus that would take her away.

Cast
 Jennifer O'Neill as Elena Bardi
 Franco Nero as Professore Belcore
 James Mason as Bellocampo
 Orazio Orlando as Ispettore
 Aldo Giuffrè as Maresciallo
 Claudio Gora as Deputate Cataudella
 Luigi Bonos as Canaino
 Carla Calò
 Gino Pagnani as Profumo
 Franco Fabrizi as Dottore Sanguedolce

References

External links

1975 films
1975 drama films
1970s Italian-language films
Films directed by Luigi Zampa
Films scored by Ennio Morricone
Films produced by Zev Braun
Italian drama films
1970s Italian films